EB Games Expo, commonly known as EB Expo or EBX, was a video game trade fair / convention held annually from 2011 to 2018 in Australia. It was organised by EB Games Australia. It was used by many video game developers to show off their upcoming games and game-related hardware. Unlike E3, EB Expo allowed members of the general public to attend. The most recent show was held in 2018 as part of the Penny Arcade Expo.

EB Games Expo 2011 
EB Games Expo 2011 was held at the Gold Coast Convention and Exhibition Centre from 15 to 16 October; it was the first time the event was open to the public. The expo was attended by 14,278 people and 26 exhibitors.

Exhibitors

EB Games Expo 2012 
EB Games Expo 2012 was held at the Sydney Showground from 5–7 October, and was the first time it was held at the venue. It was announced during the Friday and Saturday 'Twilight Spectacular' shows that the Expo will be held at the same location in 2013 and 2014, as part of a 3-year contract for the event organiser. The expo was attended by 30,745 people and 32 exhibitors.

Exhibitors

EB Games Expo 2013 

EB Games Expo 2013 was held at the Sydney Showground from 4–6 October. The expo was attended by over 38,000 people.

Exhibitors

EB Games Expo 2014 
EB Games Expo 2014 was held at the Sydney Showground from 3–5 October. Sessions were from 9am to 3pm and from 3pm to 9pm. Twilight session was only allowed for persons 15+

Exhibitors

EB Games Expo 2015 

The 2015 edition of the EB Games Expo ran from 2–4 October 2015 at the Sydney Showground. The event had two "daylight" and "twilight" sessions, each 6 and 4 hours in length respectively, on 2 and 3 October, with one 6-hour session on 4 October, following the same format as the previous two years. The Dome (Hall 1), Ross Pavilion (Hall 2) and Binnie Pavilion (Hall 3) will once again host the exhibition floor itself. The Expo was the third to showcase games for the PlayStation 4 and the Xbox One, and will be the fifth to showcase games for the Wii U. Multi-platform games Star Wars: Battlefront and Call of Duty: Black Ops III were available to play exclusively at Sony Computer Entertainment's PlayStation stand.

Exhibition 
The 2015 EB Games Expo was held at the Sydney Showground, located in Sydney Olympic Park. The expo occupied The Dome, its neighboring pavilions and the Southee Complex to the north of The Dome. The event was open on two "daylight" and "twilight" sessions, each 6 and 4 hours in length respectively, on 2 and 3 October, with one 6-hour session on 4 October, following the same format as the previous two years.

The 2015 edition of the EB Games Expo was the first without the presence of Riot Games or League of Legends. In previous years, Riot had staged the annual Oceanic Regional Finals for League at the convention, but had instead chosen to host it instead in August 2015 at Luna Park Sydney, where it was able to host a larger audience than the Southee Complex at the Sydney Showground; the event's previous venue at the 2014 EB Games Expo.

Entertainment 
The Expo featured a performance from comedy duo The Umbilical Brothers, and comedian John Robertson, presenting his stand-up act Horror Stories from a Bad Gamer.

Exhibitors 
The Expo was the third to showcase games for the PlayStation 4 and the Xbox One, and the fifth to showcase games for the Wii U. Highly anticipated titles Electronic Arts' Star Wars: Battlefront and the twelfth entry in the Call of Duty franchise, Call of Duty: Black Ops III, were made exclusive to play at Sony's PlayStation stand. Activision showcased the fifth entry in the Skylanders franchise with Skylanders: Superchargers, promoting the game at the event by giving away exclusive "Frightful Fiesta" Skylanders figures to the first few attendees to visit the booth. In addition to Forza Motorsport 6 and Remedy Entertainment's Quantum Break, the highly anticipated Halo 5: Guardians was available to play at the Xbox booth, showcasing the game's 24-player "Warzone" multiplayer mode on the show floor. The Xbox stand also made use of a "One Pass", a card that allowed attendees to tap in after playing certain games in the booth, entering a draw to win prizes. In contrast to previous years where the One Pass was a separate card, it was incorporated into the wristband sold upon the purchase of a ticket to the expo.

Showcase

EB Games Expo 2016 

The sixth annual running of the EB Games took place at the Sydney Showground from 30 September to 2 October 2016. PlayStation VR made its second and final appearance before its commercial release in October 2016. Ubisoft's lineup of games for 2016–17 release included Watch Dogs 2, For Honor, Just Dance 2017, Tom Clancy's Ghost Recon: Wildlands, Steep and South Park: The Fractured But Whole.

Exhibition 
Following an identical format to previous years, the 2016 edition of the EB Games Expo was open on two sessions on the Friday and Saturday of the expo, known as "daylight" and "twilight" sessions, and a single session on Sunday. Daylight sessions last six hours, from 9am to 3pm, while twilight sessions run for 5 hours from 4pm to 9pm; the Sunday session, designated as "family day", lasts eight hours.

The expo featured an "E-Sports Alley", touted as an e-sports competition venue for "kids, parents and pro e-athletes". Over 2,000 prizes, worth $10,000 in total, were given away in competitions held at the E-Sports Alley. Competitions for cosplayers were also held, as per tradition at the expo, with exclusive competitions and prizes, worth $5,000, available to those who purchased an "Ultimate Cosplayer Pass" ticket – a new ticket class introduced for the 2016 expo.

Entertainment 
Non-gaming attractions at the 2016 edition of the EB Games Expo include the annual Lego exhibition, a "horror maze", movie vehicles, and the Zing Pop Culture and EB Games Megastore.

Exhibitors and games 
Nine video game publishers have so far been confirmed as exhibitors at the EB Games Expo 2016, including Activision, Nintendo, Sony Interactive Entertainment (PlayStation), Ubisoft and Microsoft Studios (Xbox). Electronic Arts, who have exhibited at the EB Games Expo since 2011, have not yet announced their intention to exhibit at the 2016 edition of the expo. PlayStation VR will make its second appearance at the expo, and will be its final appearance at the show before its scheduled commercial release in October 2016.

Showcase

EB Games Expo 2017 
EB Games Expo 2017 was held on 7–8 October at the Gold Coast Convention and Exhibition Centre.

EB Games Expo 2018 
On 13 March 2018 it was announced that EB Games Expo 2018 would be held between 26 and 28 October 2018 as part of the Penny Arcade Expo at the Melbourne Convention and Exhibition Centre.

References 

Video game trade shows
Exhibitions in Australia
Recurring events established in 2011
GameStop
Video gaming in Australia